Prionolomia heros is a species of squash bugs belonging to the Coreidae family.

Distribution
This species is present in Indonesia.

References

Mictini
Insects of Indonesia
Insects described in 1794